Events from the year 1310 in the Kingdom of Scotland.

Incumbents
 Monarch – Robert I

Events
 24 February – twelve Scottish bishops swear fealty to King Robert the Bruce
 August – King Edward II invades Scotland for the first time
unknown date –
Robert the Bruce sends a letter to King Edward II seeking peace but asserting his God-given authority as king of the Scots and addressing Edward as his equal

Deaths
unknown date
 John de Soules, one of the Guardians of Scotland

See also

 Timeline of Scottish history

References

 
Years of the 14th century in Scotland
Wars of Scottish Independence